Nita Kumar completed her Ph.D. from the University of Chicago in History and has taught at the University of Chicago, Brown University, and the University of Michigan among other places. She presently holds the Brown Family Chair of South Asian History at Claremont McKenna College, Claremont, California. Kumar studied Anthropology alongside History and has been productive in research and publishing in both fields. She has further moved on to include women's and gender studies, literary criticism, education and performance studies in her approach.

From 1990, Kumar has been associated with NIRMAN, a non-profit NGO that works for education and the arts in Varanasi, India. Kumar's scholarship has included a questioning of the pursuit of agency and  ‘justice’ in history, and the responsibilities of the scholar towards her subject(s) of study. At NIRMAN, Kumar has taught, written curricula, trained teachers, and worked on children's books and arts. She has worked with weavers’ children, working-class women, and village families. These are also subjects she has written the histories and anthropologies of.

Kumar has presented her research on education, democracy, modernity, and children in India at numerous places, and continues to do so.

Selected publications
 The Artisans of Banaras (Princeton, 1988)
 Friends, Brothers and Informants: Fieldwork Memoirs of Banaras (Berkeley, 1992)
 Women as Subjects, ed. (Virginia and Calcutta, 1994)
 Lessons from Schools (Sage, 2001)
 Mai, trans., by Geetanjali Shree (Kali for Women, 2001)
 The Politics of Gender, Community and Modernities: Essays on Education in India (Oxford, 2007)

External links
 Academic profile  at Claremont McKenna College
 Website 
 Blog

References

20th-century Indian social scientists
20th-century Indian women
American anthropologists
American educational theorists
American people of Indian descent
American social sciences writers
Claremont McKenna College faculty
Historians of South Asia
Indian social sciences writers
Indian women educational theorists
Living people
Recipients of the Sahitya Akademi Prize for Translation
University of Chicago alumni
University of Michigan staff
Year of birth missing (living people)